The Constitution of Equatorial Guinea is the basic document of that country. It was approved in 1991 and amended in 1995. In 2011, a referendum was held on a series of constitutional amendments.

Historical constitutions
 1968 Equatorial Guinea constitution
 1973 Equatorial Guinea constitution
 1982 Equatorial Guinea constitution

References

Government of Equatorial Guinea
Law of Equatorial Guinea